Moonravathu Kann is a 1993 Tamil-language thriller film written and directed by Manivannan and produced by M. Rajarathinam. The story is inspired from Alfred Hitchcock's Rear Window. The film stars Sarath Kumar, Nizhalgal Ravi, Raja and Monisha, while Mansoor Ali Khan, Vinu Chakravarthy, Sridivya, Yuvasri, and Ganeshkar play supporting roles. The film had music by Deva, cinematography by S. Sankar, and editing by P. Venkateswara Rao. The film was released on 18 September 1993. It was dubbed and released in Telugu as Secret Killers.

Plot
The rich woman Priya (Monisha) and the poor man Sundar (Raja) fall in love with each other. One day, Priya tries to elope with her lover Sundar but she fails, and her parents (Vinu Chakravarthy and Srividya) lock her in her bedroom. That night, from her bedroom, Priya witnesses the murder of Shanthi (Yuvasri) by her husband Sabapathy (Nizhalgal Ravi) in the opposite building. She takes photos of this murder with her camera, and Sabapathy notices this act. Priya even shouts from her room, but her parents ignore her, thinking she is shouting because she has been locked up in her room.

The next day, all friends and relatives come for Shanthi's death. Shanthi's parents arrive and ask Sabapathy about what happened to her. He lies to them that Shanthi complained of chest pains, and before he could call the doctor, she died. Gopi (Ganeshkar), Shanthi's brother, only knows that his brother-in-law tortured his sister for a long time. In the past, Shanthi used to tell Gopi that her husband behaves like a caring and loving husband in public, but in private, they used to fight a lot. She also tells Gopi that she suspects that her husband has an affair with someone. Remembering this, Gopi shouts that Sabapathy killed his sister, but all others subdue him since they consider Sabapathy as a perfect gentleman. Gopi requests his parents to conduct an autopsy on his sister's body, but his parents ignore this plea and cremate her body. The desperate Gopi then secretly files a complaint against Sabapathy. However, the honest police officer Sarath (R. Sarathkumar) gives up the case due to lack of evidence.

Sabapathy starts to pressure Priya to give him the negative. In the meantime, Priya's parents decide to marry Priya to their relative. Priya tells about the murder's scene to her maid Sornakili (Pasi Sathya), and Priya gives her the negative. Sornakili later gives the negative to a photographer (Sudhangan) who then blackmails Sabapathy to get money from him. Thereafter, Sabapathy kills Sornakili and the photographer, and he burns the proofs. Sarath then investigates these two murders and he finds out that Sabapathy is the killer. Thereafter, Sabapathy tries to kill Priya, but Sarath tracks them down and shoots Sabapathy dead.

Cast

Sarath Kumar as Inspector Sarath 
Nizhalgal Ravi as Sabapathy
Raja as Sundar
Monisha as Priya
Mansoor Ali Khan as Subbarayan
Vinu Chakravarthy as Shanmuganathan, Priya's father
Srividya as Priya's mother
Yuvasri as Shanthi
Ganeshkar as Gopi
Vasu as Thulukanam
Pasi Sathya as Sornakili
Sudhangan as Photographer
Sundar C as Studio Assistant
Veeraraghavan as Shanthi's father
Sharmili as Sabapathy's mistress
Vellai Subbaiah as Corporation Worker
Karuppu Subbiah as Corporation Worker
Sounder
Thideer Kannaiah
S. N. Vasanth as Groom (guest appearance)
Silk Smitha (item number)

Soundtrack
The film score and the soundtrack were composed by film composer Deva. The soundtrack, released in 1993, features 2 tracks with lyrics written by Kalidasan.

References

1993 films
Films scored by Deva (composer)
Indian thriller films
1990s Tamil-language films
Films directed by Manivannan
1993 thriller films